Blatnica Pokupska is a village in Croatia. It is connected by the D36 highway. There were 59 inhabitants living there in 2001.

References

Populated places in Karlovac County